Kelle is a district in the Cuvette-Ouest Region of western Republic of the Congo. The capital lies at Kelle.

Towns and villages

Cuvette-Ouest Department
Districts of the Republic of the Congo